Lore Lorentz (12 September 1920 – 22 February 1994) was a German Kabarett artist and standup comedian.

She was born in Mährisch-Ostrau, Czechoslovakia (today Ostrava in the Czech Republic) as Lore Schirmer. She studied history, German literature and philosophy in Berlin and Vienna. In Berlin she met , who became her husband in 1944. Together they founded the Kabarett Kom(m)ödchen in Düsseldorf in 1947. It was one of the first political cabarets in Allied-occupied Germany after the Second World War. Until 1983 Lore and Kay Lorentz were directors of the Kommödchen and part of the ensemble.

Starting in 1976, she taught chanson, song and musical at Folkwang Hochschule.

From 1983, she started with solo programs. One of her most famous programs consisted exclusively of texts written by Heinrich Heine; even though he had written them more than a century before Lorentz' program was performed, they all referred to current topics. 

She received several prizes:
1981: Honorary 
1986: 
1989: Großer 
2004: Start on the Walk of Fame of Cabaret (posthumous)
Kay and Lore Lorentz rejected the Bundesverdienstkreuz (Federal Cross of Merit) in 1976. A secondary school in Düsseldorf is named in her honour.

She died in 1994 in Düsseldorf of pneumonia.

On audio CD:
Denk ich an Deutschland (A cabaret evening with texts of Heinrich Heine). CD. 
Chansons. CD. 
Frivolitäten – 10 Diseusen – 10 Chansons. LP. Polydor J 73 555

References

External links

Kabarettists
German artists
German cabaret performers
People from Ostrava
People from Düsseldorf
1920 births
1994 deaths
Academic staff of the Folkwang University of the Arts
Czechoslovak emigrants to Germany
Czechoslovak expatriates in Austria
Deaths from pneumonia in Germany